Al Eisenstat (born 1930) was an American lawyer and business executive. He served as general counsel, Senior Vice President and board member at Apple Computer.

Career
Eisenstat was the co-founder of United Data Centers, which was later sold to Tymshare.

In 1982, Eisenstat was Apple's corporate secretary and vice president of marketing. In 1985 he was vice president of investor relations and also its chief legal officer. During his time with the company, Eisenstat recommended that Apple buy AOL. He also  participated in the selection of Michael Spindler as CEO, replacing John Sculley. In 1993 Eisenstat sued Apple for wrongful dismissal.

References 

Directors of Apple Inc.
Apple Inc. executives
1930 births
Living people